Warachani (Aymara waracha wooden camp bed, -ni a suffix to indicate ownership, "the one with a wooden camp bed", Hispanicized spelling Huarachani) is a mountain in the Andes of Peru, about  high. It is located in the Puno Region, Sandia Province, on the border of the districts Limbani and Patambuco. It lies at the Ariquma valley northeast of the peaks of Ariquma.

References 

Mountains of Puno Region
Mountains of Peru